Marston Taylor Bogert (April 18, 1868 – March 21, 1954) was an American chemist.

Biography 
He was born in Flushing, New York on April 18, 1868 and studied at the Flushing Institute, which was a well known private school, where he was a straight-A student.

He entered Columbia College in New York in 1886 and graduated in 1890 with an A.B. degree. He entered the new Columbia School of Mines and gained a PhD in 1894. He stayed on to teach organic chemistry and in 1904 was appointed a full professor, retiring in 1939 as Emeritus Professor of Organic Chemistry in Residence.

In 1893 he married Charlotte Hoogland.

He was President of the American Chemical Society 1907-8 and President of the Society of Chemical Industry in 1912.

During the First World War he served as a colonel in the US Chemical Warfare Service, and in the Second World War served on the Chemical Industry Branch of the War Production Board.

He died in New York City on March 21, 1954.

Honors and awards
1906: Awarded the William H. Nichols Medal
1916: He was elected to the National Academy of Sciences.
1936: Awarded the American Institute of Chemists Gold Medal
1938: Awarded the Priestley Medal by the American Chemical Society.
From 1938 to 1947, he was the president of IUPAC.

References

External links 

1868 births
1954 deaths
American chemists
Columbia University faculty
Columbia School of Mines alumni
Columbia College (New York) alumni